Occoquan is a town in Prince William County, Virginia. The population was 934 at the 2010 United States Census. The town is a suburb of Washington, D.C. and is adjacent to Woodbridge. The current mayor is Earnest W. Porta Jr.

History 
Occoquan is derived from an Algonquian Doeg Indian word, meaning "at the end of the water". Located on the Occoquan River, Occoquan was long a site of indigenous peoples' habitation. Like the British colonists after them, they relied on the river for transportation and trade, as well as fish. Early in the 1600s Capt. John Smith sailed and explored the Occoquan River. 
In 1608, when the first European reached Northern Virginia, the Tauxenent tribe (also known by the English as the "Dogues") had its main village at the mouth of the Occoquan River. This tribe was more closely associated with neighbors such as the Piscataways (located across the Potomac River in what is now Maryland) than the other Algonquian-speaking tribes to the south. The local chief was called a Tayac, who was subservient to an "emperor" located in Prince Georges County.

By 1765, Anglo-American colonists had established an industrial settlement at Occoquan, with grist mills and tobacco warehouses. The Merchant's Mill was the first automated grist mill in the nation. It operated for 175 years until destroyed by fire.

During the Civil War, the post office passed letters and packages between North and South. River silting reduced ship traffic to Occoquan and ended its days as a port, as did the shift in traffic to railroads.

The town has survived and thrived. Today, it is a restored artists' community, with shops, outdoor dining, ghost walks, a town boat dock and more.  A number of structures in town, including many in the downtown commercial area, are part of the Occoquan Historic District listed on the National Register of Historic Places (NRHP).  Rockledge, the former house of the town's founder, is also listed as a significant structure on the NRHP.

Geography
Occoquan is located at  (38.682916, −77.260830) on the north side of the peninsula known as Linton Neck.

According to the United States Census Bureau, the town has a total area of 0.2 square mile (0.5 km2) of which, 0.2 square mile (0.4 km2) is land and 0.04 square mile (0.1 km2) (15.79%) is water.

Occoquan lies on the south bank of the Occoquan River at the Fall Line.

Demographics

As of the census of 2000, there were 759 people, 418 households, and 186 families living in the town. The population density was 4,868.7 people per square mile (1,831.6/km2). There were 443 housing units at an average density of 2,841.7 per square mile (1,069.0/km2). The racial makeup of the town was 85.51% White, 8.17% Black, 0.53% Native American, 1.58% Asian, 0.13% Pacific Islander, 1.58% from other races, and 2.50% from two or more races. Hispanic or Latino of any race were 6.46% of the population.

There were 418 households, out of which 11.5% had children under the age of 18 living with them, 35.6% were married couples living together, 6.2% had a female householder with no husband present, and 55.3% were non-families. 45.9% of all households were made up of individuals, and 8.1% had someone living alone who was 65 years of age or older. The average household size was 1.82 and the average family size was 2.54.

In the town, the population was spread out, with 11.1% under the age of 18, 8.0% from 18 to 24, 36.2% from 25 to 44, 33.6% from 45 to 64, and 11.1% who were 65 years of age or older. The median age was 42 years. For every 100 females, there were 88.8 males. For every 100 females age 18 and over, there were 92.3 males.

The median income for a household in the town was $48,750, and the median income for a family was $77,420. Males had a median income of $50,938 versus $30,833 for females. The per capita income for the town was $33,007. None of the families and 5.7% of the population were living below the poverty line, including no under eighteens and 14.9% of those over 64.

As of the census of 2010, there were 934 people living in the town of Occoquan.

Transportation
Primary access to Occoquan is provided via Virginia State Route 123, which runs north to Interstate 66 and south to Interstate 95. Additional local roads provide access to neighboring portions of unincorporated Prince William County.

Notable people
 

William Smoot (about 1848-1938), resident of Occoquan, a Baptist preacher

References

External links

 Town of Occoquan
 Prince William County Government
 Lake Ridge - Occoquan Patch: A local community news site covering Occoquan and the surrounding area.
 OccoquanWaterfront: A blog about living and boating in Historic Occoquan
 Historic Occoquan shopping, dining, and event information
 Occoquan Today
 Friends of the Occoquan

Towns in Prince William County, Virginia
Populated places established in 1765
1765 establishments in Virginia